These are the results of the rhythmic team all-around competition, one of the two events of the rhythmic gymnastics discipline contested at the 1996 Summer Olympics. These games marked the beginning of the olympic career of Almudena Cid from Spain who went to compete in another three more olympic games.

Qualification

In the first round there were thirty seven competitors. From that thirty seven the highest scoring twenty would go on to the next round. From that twenty the highest scoring ten would go on to the final round.

Final

References

External links
 http://www.gymnasticsresults.com/olympics/og1996rg.html

Women's rhythmic individual all-around
1996
1996 in women's gymnastics
Women's events at the 1996 Summer Olympics